Deeya Maskey or Diya Maskey is a Nepalese movie actress, accomplished dancer, theater artist and a theatre director. She is also well known as popular judge/gang leader on TV reality show Himalaya Roadies. She debuted on Nepalese film Kagbeni which was directed by one of the most influential director of Nepali film industry Bhusan Dahal. It is said that the movie had brought Nepali movie industry to some new milestone.

Deeya Maskey is considered as an actress who prefers to work in art films and non-commercial movies. Kagbeni, Saanghuro, Soongava, Dokh, Prakash are some examples of non-commercial movies done by her. Deeya Maskey who has also worked in numerous theatrical plays and dramas marked  her debut as a theater director from the play "Katha Kasturi" in 2022.

Personal life 
Maskey married popular Nepalese actor, theater artist, theater director and movie director Anup Baral in 2014.She also runs her own acting school "Actors Studio Nepal".

Filmography
FILMS 

SHORT MOVIES 

TV SHOWS 

 
DANCE AND MUSIC VIDEOS 
She has also appeared in numerous nepali music videos making her one of the most critically acclaimed Nepali dancer and actress in Nepal.Her first ever modeling in a music video was in one of the most successful Nepali song of 90's 'Bhijyo Sirani'.Her latest performance in a music video is in "Fatyo ni maiti ko chino" song by Astha Raut. Most probably Deeya Maskey who has her qualification in dancing field has appeared in more than 70+ dancing videos, music videos, and play dances.

References

External links 

Living people
Year of birth missing (living people)
Actors from Kathmandu
Nepalese film actresses
Nepalese television actresses
Actresses in Nepali cinema
Actresses in Nepali television
21st-century Nepalese actresses